Throughout history, forms of art have gone through periodic abrupt changes called artistic revolutions.  Movements have come to an end to be replaced by a new movement markedly different in striking ways.

Scientific and technological 

Not all artistic revolutions were political. Sometimes, science and technological innovations have brought about unforeseen transformations in the works of artists.  The stylistic revolution known as Impressionism,  by painters eager to more accurately capture the changing colors of light and shadow, is inseparable from discoveries and inventions in the mid-19th century in which the style was born.

Michel Eugène Chevreul, a French chemist hired as director of dyes at a French tapestry works,  began to investigate the optical nature of color in order to improve color in fabrics.  Chevreul realized It was the eye, and not the dye, that had the greatest influence on color, and from this, he revolutionized color theory by grasping what came to be called the law of simultaneous contrast: that colors mutually influence one another when juxtaposed, each imposing its own complementary color on the other.  The French painter Eugène Delacroix, who had been experimenting with what he called broken tones, embraced Chevreul's book, The Law of Contrast of Color (1839) with its explanations of how juxtaposed colors can enhance or diminish each other, and his exploration of all the visible colors of the spectrum.  Inspired by Chevreul’s 1839 treatise, Delacroix passed his enthusiasm on to the young artists who were inspired by him. It was Chevreul who led the Impressionists to grasp that they should apply separate brushstrokes of pure color to a canvas and allow the viewer’s eye to combine them optically.

They were aided greatly in this by innovations in oil paint itself. Since the Renaissance,  painters had to grind pigment, add oil and thus create their own paints; these time-consuming paints also quickly dried out, making studio painting a necessity for large works, and limiting painters to mix one or two colors at a time and fill in an entire area using just that one color before it dried out.  In 1841, a little-known American painter named John G. Rand invented a simple improvement without which the Impressionist movement could not have occurred: the small, flexible tin tube with removable cap in which oil paints could be stored. Oil paints kept in such tubes stayed moist, usable, and portable. For the first time since the Renaissance, painters were not trapped by the time frame of how quickly oil paint dried.

Paints in tubes could be easily loaded up and carried out into the real world,  to directly observe the play of color and natural light, in shadow and movement, to paint in the moment.  Selling the oil paint in tubes also brought about the arrival of dazzling new pigments -  chrome yellow, cadmium blue - invented by 19th century industrial chemists. The tubes freed the Impressionists to paint quickly, and across an entire canvas, rather than carefully delineated single-color sections at a time; in short, to sketch directly in oil - racing across the canvas in every color that came to hand and thus inspiring their name of "impressionists" - since such speedy, bold brushwork and dabs of separate colors made contemporary critics think their paintings were mere impressions, not finished paintings, which were to have no visible brush marks at all, seamless under layers of varnish.

Pierre-Auguste Renoir said, “Without colors in tubes, there would be no Cézanne, no Monet, no Pissarro, and no Impressionism.”

Finally, the careful, hyper-realistic techniques of French neo-classicism were seen as stiff and lifeless when compared to the remarkable new vision of the world as seen through the new invention of photography by the mid-1850s.  It was not merely that the increasing ability of this new invention, particularly by the French inventor Daguerre, made the realism of the painted image redundant as he deliberately competed in the Paris diorama with large-scale historical paintings.  The neo-classical subject matter, limited by Academic tradition to Greek and Roman legends, historical battles and Biblical stories, seemed oppressively clichéd and limited to artists eager to explore the actual world in front of their own eyes revealed by the camera - daily life, candid groupings of everyday people doing simple things, Paris itself, rural landscapes and most particularly the play of captured light - not the imaginary lionizing of unseen past events. Early photographs influenced Impressionist style by its use of asymmetry, cropping and most obviously the blurring of motion, as inadvertently captured in the very slow speeds of early photography.

Edgar Degas, Claude Monet, Pierre-Auguste Renoir - in their framing, use of color, light and shadow, subject matter - put these innovations to work to create a new language of visual beauty and meaning.

Faking revolution: the CIA and Abstract Expressionism 

Their initial break with realism into an exploration of light, color and the nature of paint was brought to an ultimate conclusion by the abstract expressionists who broke away from recognizable content of any kind into works of pure shape, color and painterliness which emerged at the end of the Second World War.  At first thought of as primitive, inept works - as in "my four year old could do that - these works were misunderstood and neglected until given critical and support by the rise of art journalists and critics who championed their work in the 1940s and 50s, expressing the power of such work in aesthetic terms the artists themselves seldom used, or even understood.  Jackson Pollock who pioneered splatter painting, dispensing with a paint brush altogether, soon became lionized as the angry young man in a large spread in Life magazine.

In fact, in a deliberate, secret and successful effort to separate artistic revolutions from political ones, abstract expressionists like Pollock, Robert Motherwell, Willem de Kooning and Mark Rothko, while seemingly difficult, pathbreaking artists, were in fact secretly supported for twenty years by the Central Intelligence Agency (CIA) in a Cold War policy begun in 1947 to prove that the United States could foster more artistic freedom than the Soviet bloc.  "It was recognized that Abstract Expressionism was the kind of art that made Socialist Realism look even more stylized and rigid and confined than it was," said former CIA case worker Donald Jameson, who finally broke the silence on this program in 1995.  Ironically, the covert CIA support for these radical works was required because an attempt to use government funds for a European tour of these works during the Truman administration led to a public uproar in conservative McCarthy-era America, with Truman famously remarking, "If that's art, I'm a Hottentot."  Thus, the program was hidden under the guise of fabricated foundations and the support of wealthy patrons who were actually using CIA funds, not their own, to sponsor traveling exhibitions of American abstract expressionists all over the world, publish books and articles praising them and to purchase and exhibit abstract expressionist works in major American and British museums. Thomas Braden, in charge of these cultural programs for the CIA, in the early years of the Cold War, had formerly been executive secretary of the Museum of Modern Art, America's leading institution for 20th century art and the charges of collusion between the two echoed for many years after this program was revealed, though most of the artists involved had no idea they were being used in this way and were furious when they found out.

See also 

 Cultural movement

References

Art history
Revolutions by type